The Bohr equation, named after Danish physician Christian Bohr (1855–1911), describes the amount of physiological dead space in a person's lungs.  This is given as a ratio of dead space to tidal volume.  It differs from anatomical dead space as measured by Fowler's method as it includes alveolar dead space.

Description 

The Bohr equation is used to quantify the ratio of physiological dead space to the total tidal volume, and gives an indication of the extent of wasted ventilation. The original formulation by Bohr, required measurement of the alveolar partial pressure PA.

The modification by Enghoff replaced the mixed alveolar partial pressure of CO2 with the arterial partial pressure of that gas.

The Bohr equation, with Enghoff's modification, is commonly stated as follows:

 is the partial pressure of carbon dioxide in the arterial blood, and 
  is the partial pressure of carbon dioxide in the average expired (exhaled) air.

Derivation 

Its derivation is based on the fact that only the ventilated gases involved in gas exchange will produce CO2.

Initially, Bohr tells us VT = Vd + VA. The Bohr equation helps us find the amount of any expired gas, N2, O2, etc.

In this case we will focus on CO2.

Defining Fe as the fraction of CO2 in the average expired breath, FA as the fraction of CO2 in the perfused alveolar volume, and Fd as the CO2 makeup of the unperfused (and thus 'dead') region of the lung;

VT x Fe = ( Vd x Fd ) + (VA x FA ).

This states that all of the CO2 expired comes from two regions, the dead space volume and the alveolar volume. 
If we suppose that Fd = 0 (since carbon dioxide's concentration in air is normally negligible), then we can say that:

          Where  = Fraction expired CO2, and  = Alveolar fraction of CO2.

    Substituted as above.

   Multiply out the brackets.

   Rearranging.

The only source of CO2 is the alveolar space where gas exchange with blood takes place. Thus the alveolar fractional component of CO2, FA, will always be higher than the average CO2 content of the expired air because of a non-zero dead space volume Vd, thus the above equation will always yield a positive number.

Where Ptot is the total pressure, we obtain:
 and

Therefore:

A common step is to then presume that the partial pressure of carbon dioxide in the end-tidal exhaled air is in equilibrium with that gas' tension in the blood that leaves the alveolar capillaries of the lung.

References 

Respiratory physiology